Madhesh Province is a Nepalese province in southeastern Nepal. It was formed after the adoption of the Constitution of Nepal. It borders Koshi Pradesh to the east, Bagmati Province to the north, and India’s Bihar state to the south. It has an area of  covering about 6.5% of the country's total area. It has a population of 6,126,288 as per the 2021 Nepal census, making it Nepal's most densely populated province and smallest province by area.

The Kosi River  acts as provincial demarcation border between the Province and Koshi Pradesh in the east. And the demarcation line between Chitwan National Park and Parsa National Park acts as provincial demarcation border between Madhesh Province and Bagmati Province in the west.

The province includes eight districts from Saptari District in the east to Parsa District in the west. The majority of the province's population speaks Maithili, Bhojpuri and Nepali including Maithili dialect such as  Thēthi and Bajjika

The Capital city, a sub-metropolitan city of Janakpur, also known as Janakpurdham, is a centre for religious and cultural tourism. It  also have been the capital of the Videha dynasty that ruled Mithila region in ancient times.

The first urban planned municipality of Nepal, Rajbiraj, is also the oldest municipality of the Terai belt of Nepal. The town is believed to have been named after the ancient Rajdevi Temple, which dates back to the 1700s. The metropolitan city of Birgunj is an economically important industrial centre and the only metropolitan city in the province.

On 17 January 2022, the meeting of Provincial assembly declared Janakpur as capital of Province No. 2 while the province was renamed to Madhesh Province. Hari Shankar Mishra is the Head of Province while Saroj Yadav is the current Chief Minister.

Etymology

The word madhesh is thought to be derived from the Sanskrit madhya desh (मध्य देश), literally the middle country, which refers to "the central region, the country lying between the Himalaya and the Vindhya mountains". However, in the context of Nepal, Madhesh refers to the region in the Nepal Terai located south of the Siwalik Hills.
Madhesh has also been defined as the cultural and linguistic space existing as a basis for identity among the people of the Terai.

History

Vedic period
Madhesh Province is located in the Nepalese portion of the Mithila region, a cultural and historical region now divided between Nepal and India. Mithila first gained prominence after being settled by Indo-Aryan peoples who established the Videha kingdom. During the Later Vedic period (c. 1100–500 BCE), Videha became one of the major political and cultural centers of Ancient India, along with Kuru and Panchala. The kings of the Videha Kingdom were called Janakas. The Videha Kingdom was later incorporated into the Vajjika League, which had its capital in the city of Vaishali, which is located in Indian Mithila.

Medieval period
From the 11th century to the 20th century, Mithila was ruled by various indigenous dynasties. The first of these were the Karnatas, the Oiniwar Dynasty and the Khandwala Dynasty a.k.a. Raj Darbhanga. The Malla and Licchavi dynasties of Nepal were also Maithil in origin. The rulers of the Oiniwar dynasty and the Raj Darbhanga were Maithil Brahmins. During the reign of the Raj Darbhanga family, the capital of Mithila was shifted to Darbhanga.

Harisimhadeva (r. 1295 to 1324 CE), the sixth descendant of Nanyadeva was ruling the Tirhut Kingdom. At the same time, the Tughlaq dynasty came to power, which ruled the Delhi sultanate and whole Northern India from 1320 to 1413 CE. In 1324 CE, the founder of the Tughlaq dynasty and Delhi Sultan, Ghiyath al-Din Tughluq turned his attention towards Bengal. The Tughlaq army invaded Bengal and on his way back to Delhi, The sultan heard about the Simraungarh which was flourishing inside the jungle. The last king of the Karnata dynasty Harisingh Dev didn't show his strength and left the fort as he heard the news of approaching army of the Tughlaq Sultan towards the Simraungarh. The Sultan and his troop stayed there for three days and cleared the dense forest. On the third day, the army attacked and entered into the huge fort whose walls was tall and surrounded by seven big ditches.

The remains are still scattered all over the Simroungarh region. King Harisingh Deva fled northwards into the then Nepal. The son of Harisingh Dev, Jagatsingh Dev married the widow princess of Bhaktapur Nayak Devi.

18th Century Onwards

Until the mid 18th century, the Nepal Terai was divided into several smaller kingdoms, and the forests were little disturbed.
By the 16th century, the rulers of Palpa and Makwanpur controlled the mid-western Terai and extended this control to the eastern Terai by the 17th century. 
They controlled the area of today's districts of Saptari, Siraha, Dhanusa, Mahottari and Sarlahi. The rulers of Makwanpur controlled the central Terai region of present-day Madhesh Province.

Geography 
The region is surrounded by:

 The Sunsari District of Koshi Province to the East.
 The Chitwan District of Bagmati Province to the West.
 The Makwanpur District and Sindhuli District of Bagmati Province and Udayapur District of Koshi Province to the North.
India to the South.

The province is located on flat plains of Terai, and Chure (Churiya) or the Shiwalik Hills are the natural border of the province which falls on the northern side. The southern side has an international border with India. Koshi River on its eastern side acting as a natural border with Koshi Province. Madhesh Province has eight districts in a series (parallel). Koshi River, Bagmati River, Kamla River, Lakhandei River and Bishnumati River are the main rivers of the province.

Culture

Mithila Paag

The Paag is a headdress in the Mithila region of India and Nepal worn by Maithil people. It is a symbol of honour and respect and a significant part of Maithil culture.
The Paag dates back to pre-historic times when it was made of plant leaves. It exists today in a modified form. The Paag is wore by the whole Maithil community. The colour of the Paag also carries a lot of significance. The red Paag is worn by the bridegroom and by those who are undergoing the sacred thread rituals. Paag of mustard colour is donned by those attending wedding ceremonies and the elders wear a white Paag.

Paintings

Madhubani art is practiced in the Mithila region. It was traditionally created by the women of different communities of the Mithila region. This painting as a form of wall art was practiced widely throughout the region; the more recent development of painting on paper and canvas originated among the villages around Madhubani, and it is these latter developments that may correctly be referred to as Madhubani art.

Artists create these  paintings using a variety of mediums, including their own fingers, or twigs, brushes, nib-pens, and matchsticks. The paint is  created using natural dyes and pigments. The paintings are characterised by their eye-catching geometrical patterns.

Maithil cuisine

Maithil cuisine is a part of  Nepalese cuisine. It is a culinary style which originated in Mithila. Some traditional Maithil dishes are:
 Curd-flattened rice
 Vegetable of Taro
 Ghugni
 picklesmade of fruits and vegetables which are generally mixed with ingredients like salt, spices, and vegetable oils and are set to mature in a moistureless medium.
 Tarua of Coccinia grandis
 Bada
 Badee
 Yogurt 
 Irhar
 Purakiya ( also known as Gujia) which is basically dumplings.
 Foxnut payas
 Anarsa
 Bagiya

Dances

Jhijhiya

Jhijhiya is a cultural dance from the Mithila region. 

Jhijhiya is mostly performed at time of Dusshera, in dedication to Durga Bhairavi, the goddess of victory. While performing jhijhiya, women put lanterns made of clay on their head and they balance it while they dance.

Domkach

Domkach is a folk dance of the Mithila region.

Politics
As a political center of the country, Madhesh Province is home to prominent leaders like Ram Baran Yadav, Bimalendra Nidhi and Pradeep Giri from the Nepali Congress, Mahantha Thakur from Loktantrik Samajwadi Party, Nepal, Matrika Yadav from CPN (Maoist Centre) and Dharmanath Prasad Sah, Bansidhar Mishra, Ram Chandra Jha from the CPN (Unified Socialist) who have been ministers at various point of time and are still active at National level. In local level, Nepali congress remains the single largest party.

Government and Administration

Executive 

The Governor acts as the head of the province while the Chief Minister is the head of the provincial government. The present Governor and Chief Minister are Hari Shankar Mishra and Saroj Yadav respectively.

Legislative 

The province has 107 provincial assembly constituencies and 32 House of Representative constituencies.

Madhesh Province has a unicameral legislature, like all of the other provinces in Nepal. The term length of provincial assembly is five years. The Provincial Assembly of Madhesh Province is temporarily housed at the District Education Office in Janakpur.

Judiciary 
The Chief Judge of the Janakpur High Court is the head of the judiciary. The acting chief justice is Binod Sharma.

Administrative subdivisions

Madhesh Province is divided into eight districts, which are listed below. A district is administrated by the head of the District Coordination Committee and the District Administration Officer. The districts are further divided into municipalities or rural municipalities. The municipalities include one metropolitan city, three sub-metropolitan cities, and 73 municipalities. There are 59 rural municipalities in the province.

Local level government

Demographics 
According to the 2011 Nepal Census,the Province has a population of 5,391,349: 2,706,078 males and 2,685,271 females. The province has the second highest population in the country having 20.35%, and is the densest province in the country with a density of 640 people per square kilometer.

Ethnic groups 
Maithils are the largest ethnolinguistic group. Yadav is the largest group among the Madhesi people in the province making up around 14.80% of the population. Muslims are the second largest group making up 11.59% of the population. Teli (5.10%), Koiri/Kushwaha (4.56%), Chamar (4.22%), Dhanuk (3.49%), Musahar (3.02%), Kurmi (2.83%), Dusadh/Paswan (2.79%), Mallaah (2.26%), Maithil Brahmin (2.2%), and Karan Kayastha (1.5%) are other Madhesi pandit (8.0) groups in the province.

Hill Brahmans and Chhetris are the largest Khas Arya groups in the province making up 2.34% and 1.99% of the population, respectively. Tharu (5.27%) is the largest non-Madhesi, non-Khas Arya group followed by Tamang (2.17%).

Languages 
Maithili including its dialect Bajjika is spoken as the mother tongue by 60.04% of the population in the province and Bhojpuri is spoken by 18.59% and of the population. Despite being the province's official language, Nepali is spoken as their mother tongue by only 6.56% of the population. Urdu (5.88%), Tharu (3.77%) and Tamang (1.94%) are other languages spoken in the province by a significant minority population.

The Language Commission of Nepal has recommended Maithili, Bhojpuri and Bajjika as official language in the province. The commission has also recommended Urdu, Tharu and Tamang to be additional official languages, for specific regions and purposes in the province.

Religion 
Hinduism is the most followed religion in the province being followed by 84.75% of the population. Islam is the second largest religion with 11.55% of the population being Muslims and Buddhism is followed by 3.01% of the population.

Cities

Infrastructure

Transport 

Madhesh Province has no difficult terrains. However, it is the only province with a passenger serviceable railway line in Nepal.

Roadways 
The major connecting link for the province is the Mahendra Highway, which runs longitudinally across the province. All major cities of the province remain disconnected from this highway. Janakpurdham, Rajbiraj , Birgunj and Gaur lie 25,10, 24 and 42  kilometres south of the Mahendra Highway, respectively. The Tribhuvan Highway does not cross as much of the province as the Mahendra Highway, but it is most important link as it connects the province to Kathmandu and to the India. The starting point of Tribhuvan Highway i.e. Birgunj is the most important International Gateway and trade way for this province and entire country and hence known as "The Gateway of Nepal". In terms of revenue generation, Birgunj custom point is the largest.

 Mahendra Highway (East West Highway) - Part
 Postal Highway - Part
 Tribhuvan Highway - Part
 BP Highway -  part

Railways 

A few other railway projects are under progress in the Madesh province All these projects are of Nepal Railways. Government of Nepal has proposed Janakpur as a Main Station for 1024 km east–west Metro Railway project and further be extended to India and China for connecting Nepal Railways with Indian Railways and China Railway for business and tourism promotion.

 Birgunj (Nepal) to Kathmandu (Nepal)
 Birgunj, Parwanipur (Nepal) to Raxaul (India)
 Birgunj (Nepal) to Kerung (China)
 Janakpur (Nepal) to Lhasa (China)
 Bardibas, Janakpur (Nepal) to Jainagar, Bihar (India)
 Janakpur (Nepal) to Kathmandu (Nepal)
 Janakpur (Nepal) to Biratnagar (Nepal)
 Janakpur (Nepal) to Birgunj (Nepal)

Domestic Airports:
Madhesh province has three domestic airports in use which are the busiest among the country.
 Rajbiraj Airport in Rajbiraj
 Janakpur Airport in Janakpur
 Simara Airport in Pipara Simara  (BARA) close to Birgunj and Kalaiya

International Airport:
 Nijgadh International Airport in Nijgadh is under construction.

Notable people 

 Janaka, King of Mithila 
 Ruby Rana, First miss Nepal
 Ram Baran Yadav, First president of Nepal
 Bimalendra Nidhi, MP and Former deputy prime minister
 CK Raut, MP of Saptari and Head of Janamat party
 Madhav Kumar Nepal, Former Prime minister
 Upendra Yadav, Former Deputy Prime Minister and Foreign Affairs Minister
 VTEN, Rapper 
 Pradeep Yadav, Former Forest Minister

See also
Provinces of Nepal
List of districts in Nepal
Mahendra Narayan Nidhi Awas Yojana 
Nepali Congress, Madhesh Province

References

 
2
Mithila
2015 establishments in Nepal
States and territories established in 2015